Goličič is a Slovenian surname. Notable people with the surname include:

Boštjan Goličič (born 1989), Slovenian ice hockey player
Jurij Goličič (born 1981), Slovenian ice hockey player

Slovene-language surnames